Antonín Svoboda (12 January 1900 – 29 October 1965) was a Czech sprinter. He competed in the men's 100 metres and the pentathlon events at the 1924 Summer Olympics.

References

External links
 

1900 births
1965 deaths
Athletes (track and field) at the 1924 Summer Olympics
Czech male sprinters
Olympic athletes of Czechoslovakia